Chaunsa (Urdu: چونسا ; Hindi: चौंसा), also known as chausa, is a mango cultivar indigenous to South Asia. It is grown mainly in India and Pakistan; both countries export significant quantities of the fruit.

The main centers of chaunsa cultivation are Rahim Yar Khan and Multan in Pakistani Punjab, and Uttar Pradesh in India.

Chaunsa mangoes are considered to be the best mangos in the world. Pakistani mangoes are exported primarily to the Western hemisphere.

Etymology
The chaunsa variety of mango was made popular by the Indian invader Sher Shah Suri while commemorating his victory over Humayun at Chausa, Bihar. Suri ultimately named his favorite mango "chaunsa" to honor his victory. The mango was also known as the Ghazipuriya mango due to its early large-scale cultivation in Ghazipur.

Description

The fruit has a golden-yellow color when it is soft, is almost fiberless, and has an aromatic, pleasant, sweet flavor. Commonly available varieties in Pakistan are greenish-yellow. The unique taste and richness in its flavor makes it a worldwide favorite. Some consider it the best mango in terms of its rich aroma, sweet taste, juicy pulp and high nutritional value. Chaunsas have higher vitamin C content than other mango cultivars.

Chaunsa season in India and Pakistan normally starts at the beginning of June and ends in the third week of August. It is heavily exported to the Middle East, Europe, Canada, and most recently to the United States. Prior to its availability in the U.S., some American chaunsa aficionados would travel to Canada in order to legally purchase the mango. There are four known types of chaunsa mangoes: Mosami Chaunsa (Summer Bahisht), Kala Chaunsa (Black), Safaid chaunsa (White) and Azeem Chaunsa (Rattewala). White chaunsa is generally considered ideal for exports due to its longer shelf life.

References

Mango cultivars of India
Mango cultivars of Pakistan